This is a list of awards and nominations received by South Korean girl group f(x) since their debut in 2009.


Awards and nominations

References

Awards
f(x)